Jhagariya Khurd is a village in the Bhopal district of Madhya Pradesh, India. It is located in the Huzur tehsil and the Phanda block.

It is located on the Bhopal-Sehore road, between Semri Bazyaft and Badjhiri.

Demographics 

According to the 2011 census of India, Jhagariya Khurd has 131 households. The effective literacy rate (i.e. the literacy rate of population excluding children aged 6 and below) is 64.3%.

References 

Villages in Huzur tehsil